Knyaginino is the name of several inhabited localities in Russia.

Urban localities
Knyaginino, Nizhny Novgorod Oblast, a town in Knyagininsky District of Nizhny Novgorod Oblast; administratively incorporated as a town of district significance

Rural localities
Knyaginino, Rognedinsky District, Bryansk Oblast, a village in Selilovichsky Selsoviet of Rognedinsky District of Bryansk Oblast
Knyaginino, Sevsky District, Bryansk Oblast, a selo in Knyagininsky Selsoviet of Sevsky District of Bryansk Oblast
Knyaginino, Kostroma Oblast, a village in Tsentralnoye Settlement of Buysky District of Kostroma Oblast
Knyaginino, Moscow Oblast, a village in Petrovskoye Rural Settlement of Klinsky District of Moscow Oblast
Knyaginino, Novomoskovsky District, Tula Oblast, a village in Ivan-Ozersky Rural Okrug of Novomoskovsky District of Tula Oblast
Knyaginino, Odoyevsky District, Tula Oblast, a village in Botvinyevskaya Rural Administration of Odoyevsky District of Tula Oblast
Knyaginino, Vladimir Oblast, a village in Kovrovsky District of Vladimir Oblast
Knyaginino, Velikoustyugsky District, Vologda Oblast, a village in Yudinsky Selsoviet of Velikoustyugsky District of Vologda Oblast
Knyaginino, Podlesny Selsoviet, Vologodsky District, Vologda Oblast, a village in Podlesny Selsoviet of Vologodsky District of Vologda Oblast
Knyaginino, Raboche-Krestyansky Selsoviet, Vologodsky District, Vologda Oblast, a village in Raboche-Krestyansky Selsoviet of Vologodsky District of Vologda Oblast
Knyaginino, Breytovsky District, Yaroslavl Oblast, a village in Pokrovo-Sitsky Rural Okrug of Breytovsky District of Yaroslavl Oblast
Knyaginino, Poshekhonsky District, Yaroslavl Oblast, a village in Krasnovsky Rural Okrug of Poshekhonsky District of Yaroslavl Oblast